Ronald Knot (born August 8, 1994) is a Czech professional ice hockey player. He is currently playing for the Tucson Roadrunners in the American Hockey League (AHL) while under contract to the Arizona Coyotes of the National Hockey League (NHL).

Playing career
Knot made his Czech Extraliga debut playing with HC Slavia Praha during the 2012–13 Czech Extraliga season and has also played for BK Mladá Boleslav and Piráti Chomutov.

Following two seasons with HC Bílí Tygři Liberec, Knot left the ELH for the first time in his professional career, agreeing to a one-year contract with Russian club, HC Neftekhimik Nizhnekamsk of the Kontinental Hockey League (KHL), on 18 May 2021.

In the following 2021-22 season, Knot added size and a physical presence to the Neftekhimik blueline, contributing 4 goals and 17 points through 49 regular season games. He made three playoff appearances as Neftekhimik bowed out in the first-round sweep to Traktor Chelyabinsk.

As a free agent following the conclusion of his contract with Neftekhimik Nizhnekamsk, Knot left the KHL and secured a one-year, two-way contract with the Arizona Coyotes of the NHL on 1 June 2022.

Career statistics

Regular season and playoffs

International

References

External links

1994 births
Living people
HC Benátky nad Jizerou players
HC Bílí Tygři Liberec players
Czech ice hockey defencemen
BK Mladá Boleslav players
HC Neftekhimik Nizhnekamsk players
Ice hockey players at the 2022 Winter Olympics
Olympic ice hockey players of the Czech Republic
Piráti Chomutov players
HC Slavia Praha players
Ice hockey people from Prague
Tucson Roadrunners players
Czech expatriate ice hockey players in the United States
Czech expatriate ice hockey players in Russia